Federico González Peña (born c. 5 February 1966) is a Uruguayan-Argentine jazz pianist and keyboardist. After being taught by the renowned classical pianist Antonio De Raco, he moved to the United States in 1984 to pursue his studies at the Berklee College of Music, and has since played in numerous groups. He played in the trio Gaïa with harmonica player Grégoire Maret and drummer Gene Lake. He is best known though for his work with the Marcus Miller band.

References

Uruguayan jazz musicians
Jazz pianists
Jazz keyboardists
1966 births
Living people
Uruguayan emigrants to the United States
21st-century pianists